Mauricio Jordan del Castillo Agüero (born 10 March 1996) is an Argentine professional footballer who plays as a forward for Independiente.

Club career
del Castillo started his senior career with Independiente in 2016. On 3 July, del Castillo joined Deportivo Morón of Primera B Metropolitana on loan. He made his professional debut on 3 September in a 2–1 victory over Estudiantes, which was the first of six appearances in all competitions for the club. Ahead of the 2017–18 season, del Castillo signed for Primera B Metropolitana side Defensores de Belgrano. Just two appearances followed, with both occurring off the bench in March during home matches with Villa San Carlos and San Telmo. He returned to his parent club in June 2018.

After twelve months in Independiente's reserves, a spell which also saw the forward extend his contract, del Castillo was loaned out to Tristán Suárez in July 2019. His debut arrived in October against Los Andes, which would be his only match for them. Upon returning to Independiente, he again signed a new contract in August 2020. del Castillo made an Independiente competitive, first-team teamsheet for the first time on 1 November, though wasn't selected to come on in a Copa de la Liga Profesional win over Central Córdoba. His debut for the club soon arrived in that competition, as he appeared for the final moments of a 1–0 win over Defensa y Justicia on 6 December.

International career
del Castillo represented Argentina U17s at the 2013 South American Under-17 Football Championship, winning one cap against Venezuela.

Personal life
del Castillo is the brother of fellow footballers Gastón del Castillo and Sergio Agüero.

Career statistics
.

Honours

Club
Deportivo Morón
Primera B Metropolitana: 2016–17

International
Argentina U17
South American Under-17 Football Championship: 2013

Notes

References

External links

1996 births
Living people
Sportspeople from Avellaneda
Argentine footballers
Argentina youth international footballers
Association football forwards
Primera B Metropolitana players
Argentine Primera División players
Club Atlético Independiente footballers
Deportivo Morón footballers
Defensores de Belgrano footballers
CSyD Tristán Suárez footballers